The Type 100 grenade discharger was introduced in 1939 as a grenade launcher for the Type 38 and Type 99 Arisaka rifles. It launches standard Type 91 and Type 99 hand-grenades. The launcher is somewhat unusual in that rather than using the more common cup designs it is a gas trap system, meaning that it incorporates a barrel extension which taps off excess propellant gases to launch the grenade from a cup offset from the barrel. This has the advantage that standard rifle cartridges could be used along with the standard hand-grenades which simplified logistics, at the expense of increased weight and decreased efficiency.

See also
Rifle grenade

References

External links
http://www.lonesentry.com/articles/jp_rifle_grenade/index.html

World War II infantry weapons of Japan
Rifle grenades
Grenade launchers
Military equipment introduced in the 1930s